Live at Sunflancisco is a live video by Japanese noise rock band Boredoms, released in 2007 by Commmons in a DVD+CD set. The live footage was shot in San Francisco, California during the band's 2005 tour of the United States while the CD contains two brief studio tracks.

Track listing
DVD
Boredoms live at The Independent, San Francisco – 65:23
CD
"U-BUS" – 4:18
"Relerer" – 7:08

Personnel
Yamantaka Eye – turntables, DJing, vocals
Yoshimi P-We – drums, vocals
Atari – drums
Yojiro – drums
Junko Futagawa – filming
Koichi Hara – engineering
Isao Kikuchi – mastering
Ryuichi Tanaka – authoring engineering

References

Boredoms albums
Live video albums
2007 live albums
2007 video albums